The Television Ghost is an American dramatic horror anthology television series featuring ghost stories presented by George Kelting as the ghost of various murder victims. It originally aired in New York City on W2XAB (now WCBS-TV), an experimental television station of Columbia Broadcasting System (CBS),  from August 17, 1931 to February 15, 1933. Due to a lack of any preservation the entire series is widely accepted as being completely lost.

Premise
The ghosts of murder victims would tell the story of their respective murders. George Kelting was the storyteller and acted as the ghost, wearing white make-up and having a towel draped over his head. Due to the technical limitations of the time the visual effects were not impressive—the camera showed only Kelting's head.

Cast
George Kelting as the ghost-storyteller
Bill Schudt as announcer

Crew
Harry Spears – engineer

Broadcast
The series was also broadcast on radio by W2XE New York City and AM 970 WABC (forerunner to modern AM 880 WCBS, not related to the current WABC or AM 970). The Television Ghost ran for the entirety of W2XAB's two-year run as a mechanical television station. Each episode featured a run time of 15 minutes.

No audio recordings of the program were ever made, nor were any portions of the program filmed; the only known remaining documents are a few publicity photos of Kelting in costume and some newspaper mentions, making it a lost television broadcast.

It is believed to be one of the first dramatic television series in the world. For part of its run it was followed on the schedule by Piano Lessons.

References
Hawes, William, American Television Drama: The Experimental Years (University of Alabama Press, 1986)

External links

1931 American television series debuts
1933 American television series endings
1930s American television series
CBS original programming
1931 in American television
Lost American television shows
Television series about ghosts
Ghost stories
Black-and-white American television shows
American crime drama television series
Horror anthologies
American horror fiction television series
American anthology television series
Television shows about murder